List of tallest crosses in the world.

List

Planned projects
 Monterrey cross, Monterrey, Mexico, 160 m, announced in 2022
 Cross of Blaszki, Poland, 100 m, announced in 2018 
 Kraljevo Cross, Kraljevo, Serbia, 33.5 m, announced in 2015

See also
 Wayside cross
 Lithuanian cross crafting
 Khachkar
 Cross of Sacrifice

References

External links
 Tallest crosses on Skyscraperpage.com
 Some monumental crosses in the USA

 
Crosses by function
Lists of tallest structures